This is a list of matches of FC Shakhtar Donetsk in Europe. 

Shakhtar Donetsk participates in European competitions since 1976 representing the Soviet Union (Soviet Top League) and playing its first against Berliner FC Dynamo in the 1976–77 UEFA Cup. The Ukraine-based club represented the Soviet Union until the dissolution of the last in 1991. After the fall of the Soviet Union, Shakhtar represents its native country of Ukraine.

Since 1997, however, the club continuously participates on annual basis with variable successes, while also taking part in UEFA Champions League competition since 2000. Shakhtar's first qualification to a group stage in a European competition took place in the 2000–01 UEFA Champions League, when Shakhtar Donetsk played against Arsenal, Lazio and Sparta Prague in Group B. While being a constant presence in Champions League group stages, Shakhtar have only reached UEFA Cup/UEFA Europa League group stages twice (2005–06 and 2009–10).

In 2009, Shakhtar Donetsk won the UEFA Cup over Werder Bremen in the final held in Istanbul, becoming the first team in the independent Ukraine to win a European trophy. In 2010–11, Shakhtar reached the quarter-finals of Champions League, being eliminated by Barcelona; this was the first time the team qualified for the knockout phase in the Champions League. In 2015–16, despite a poor display in the Champions League group stages, Shakhtar was able to qualify to the Europa League knock-out phases by finishing third place in the group; Shakhtar reached the semi-finals after knocking out Schalke 04, Anderlecht and Braga, but were eventually knocked out by title defenders Sevilla.

Tallies balance

Tally per competition

European Cup/UEFA Champions League

UEFA Cup Winners' Cup

UEFA Cup/UEFA Europa League

UEFA Intertoto Cup

Finals

Won semi-finals

Lost semi-finals

References 

Europe
Ukrainian football clubs in international competitions
Soviet football clubs in international competitions